Arthur Si-Bita (1948-2016) was a Cameroonian film director who was one of the pioneers of Cameroon cinema.

Filmography
 Cultural Week of May 20, 1978 (1978)
 La Voice of the Poet at Mount Cameroon (1978)
 Masters and Disciples (1978)
 The Broken Guitar (1979)
 No Time to Say Goodbye (1981)
 The Cooperants (1983)
 The Lions Saga (1990)
 The Professional Voyeurs (2004)

References

Cameroonian film directors
1948 births
2016 deaths